Ali Ahmed (born October 10, 2000) is a Canadian soccer player who currently plays for Vancouver Whitecaps FC in Major League Soccer.

Early life

Ahmed was born in Toronto to Ethiopian parents. In 2018, he went on trial with the Toronto FC Academy, who were ready to sign him to join the academy, but he opted to head to Portugal to trial with the U19 side of C.F. Os Belenenses, but was unable to sign as he was under 18. He then went to Spain, before returning to Toronto, before returning to Europe to trial in Portugal, the United Kingdom, and the Netherlands. In November 2019, he trialed with the Vancouver Whitecaps Academy and then trialed again the following year, and in August 2020, he joined the Vancouver Whitecaps Academy. In 2021, he played with the Vancouver Whitecaps FC U-23. He attended pre-season camp with the first team in 2021 and 2022.

Club career
In March 2022, he signed a professional contract with Whitecaps FC 2 in MLS Next Pro. He made his professional debut on March 26 against Houston Dynamo 2. He led the team in assists with five in 2022. He was named the 2022 WFC2 Player of the Year.

On April 22, 2022, he joined the first team on a short-term four-day loan ahead of their MLS league match against Austin FC. In the match the next day, he made his official first-team debut. On August 4, he signed another short-term loan with Vancouver. In November 2022, he signed a permanent contract with the first team for the 2023 season, becoming the first Whitecaps FC 2 player to sign a first-team contract.

References

2000 births
Living people
Soccer players from Toronto
Canadian soccer players
Canadian people of Ethiopian descent
Whitecaps FC 2 players
Vancouver Whitecaps FC players
MLS Next Pro players
Major League Soccer players